Bulgakov is a rural locality (a khutor) in Sukhodolskoye Rural Settlement, Sredneakhtubinsky District, Volgograd Oblast, Russia. The population was 11 as of 2010. There are 2 streets.

Geography 
Bulgakov is located on the left bank of the Bulgakov Erik, 21 km SSE of Srednyaya Akhtuba (the district's administrative centre) by road. Talovy is the nearest rural locality.

References 

Rural localities in Sredneakhtubinsky District